A lampadarius, plural Lampadarii, from the Latin lampada, from Ancient Greek "lampas" λαμπάς (candle), was a slave who carried torches before consuls, emperors and other officials of high dignity both during the later Roman Republic and under the Empire. Lampadarios in the post-Byzantine  period designates the leader of the second (left) choir of singers in the Eastern Orthodox church practice.

Lampadarius in Christianity
There seems no special reason to attribute to the lampadarii any ecclesiastical character, though their functions were imitated by the acolytes and other clerics who preceded the bishop or celebrant, carrying torches in their hands, in the solemn procession to the altar and in other processions.
 
There is very little evidence that any strictly liturgical use was made of lamps in the early centuries of Christianity. The fact that many of the services took place at night, and that after the lapse of a generation or two the meetings of the Christians for purposes of worship were held, at Rome and elsewhere, in the subterranean chambers of the Catacombs, make it clear that lamps must have been used to provide the necessary means of illumination. Of these lamps, mostly of terra cotta and of small size, many specimens survive some of them plain, some decorated with various Christian symbols.

These admit of classification according to period and locality, the finer work, as in so many other branches of Christian art, being as a rule the earlier (see e.g. Leclercq, "Manuel d'archeologie chretienne" II, 557 seq.). Of the great metal chandeliers with their "dolphins" —i.e. little arms wrought in that shape and supporting a lamp— which came into vogue with the freedom of the Church in the days of Constantine, something has already been said under the heading Candlesticks. Such "polycandela" long remained a conspicuous feature of Byzantine worship.
 
For the connection of lamps with the liturgy at an earlier age it may be sufficient to quote a few sentences from a homily of the Syrian Narsai, who died A.D. 512, descriptive of the Liturgy. "The priests," he says, "are still, and the deacons stand in silence, the whole people is quiet and still, subdued and calm. The altar stands crowned with beauty and splendor, and upon it is the Gospel of life and the adorable wood [i.e. the cross]. The mysteries are set in order, the censers are smoking, the lamps are shining and the deacons are hovering and brandishing [fans] in likeness of watchers" (Conolly "Liturgical Homilies of Narsai", p. 12).

In nearly all the earliest representations of the Last Supper, a lamp is indicated as hanging over the table. It is easy to understand that the early Christians may have attached a quasi-liturgical significance to the lighting of lamps during the Holy Sacrifice when we remember that the pilgrim who, writing in about 530 CE, wrote the so-called "Breviarius", claims to have seen at Jerusalem what purported to be the actual lamp which had hung in the chamber of the Last Supper, preserved there as a precious relic at a site he designates the Basilica of Holy Zion, although there is uncertainty about the exact site to which he refers.

In the modern times interest principally centered in the lamp which burned perpetually before the Blessed Sacrament, and it has been the custom with many writers (see e.g. Corblet, "Hist. du sacrement de l'Eucharistie", II, 433 sq., and Thalhofer, "Liturgik", I, 670) to represent this as a tradition of very early date. But the testimonies upon which this opinion is based are, many of them, quite illusive (see "The Month", April, 1907, pp. 380 seq.). St. Paulinus of Nola, indeed, seems to speak of a silver lamp continually burning in the church: 
Paulo Crucis ante decus de limine eodem
Continuum scyphus est argenteus aptus ad usum.There is no indication that this bore any reference to the Blessed Sacrament. It would seem rather to be suggested by the context that it was of the nature of a watch light and a protection against thieves. No really conclusive evidence has yet been produced that the practice of honoring the Blessed Sacrament by burning a light continually before it is older than the latter part of the twelfth century. Still, it was undoubtedly the custom for some hundreds of years before this to burn lights before relics and shrines as a mark of honor the candles burnt by King Alfred the Great before his relics, and used by him to measure the hours, are a famous example—and it may be that this custom generally extended to the place where the Blessed Sacrament was reserved. The constant association of lights with the Holy Grail in the Grail romances is suggestive of this.
 
The great movement for providing a perpetual lamp before the altar must undoubtedly be traced to the preaching in France and England of a certain Eustace, Abbot of (?)Fleury, about A.D. 1200. "Eustace also laid it down", says Walter of Coventry, speaking of his visit to England, "that in London and in many other places, there should be in every church where it was practicable, a burning lamp or some other perpetual light before the Lord's Body." Shortly after this we begin to find the practice enjoined by synodal decrees (e.g. at Worcester, in 1240 at Saumur, in 1276, etc.), but as a rule these earlier injunctions recognize that, owing to the cost of oil and wax, such requirements could hardly be complied with in the poorer churches.
 
It was not until the sixteenth century that the maintenance of a light, wherever the Blessed Sacrament was reserved, was recognized as a matter of strict obligation. At present the official "Rituale Romanum" (Tit. IV, cap. 1) prescribes that "both by day and night two or more lamps or at least one [lampades plures vel saltem una] must burn continually before the Blessed Sacrament", and the responsibility of seeing that this is carried out rests with the priest in charge of the parish. It is further directed that the oil used should be vegetable oil, by preference that of the olive on account of its symbolism.

Exceptionally, in consequence of poverty or some other reason, a mineral oil, like petroleum, may be employed with the bishop's permission. The language of the Caeremoniale Episcoporum (I, xii, 17) might easily suggest that at least in the larger churches more lamps than one should be lit, but always an odd number, that is to say, three at least before the high altar, and five before the altar of the Blessed Sacrament. It seems, however, that this direction of the "Caeremoniale" is to be understood as applying only to greater festivals.
 
During all the Middle Ages the burning of lamps, or sometimes candles, before relics, shrines, statues, and other objects of devotion was a form of piety which greatly appealed to the alms of the faithful. Almost every collection of early English wills bears witness to it, and even in the smaller churches the number of such lights founded by private beneficence was often surprisingly great. It not infrequently happened that every guild and association maintained a special light of its own, and, besides these, we hear constantly of such objects of devotion as the "Jesus light", the "Hok-light" (which seems to have to do with a popular festival kept on the second Monday or Tuesday after Easter Sunday), the "Rood light", the "egg light" (probably maintained by contributions of eggs), the "bachelor's light", the "maiden's light", the "Soul's light", etc. Many of these bequests will be found conveniently illustrated and classified in Leland Duncan and Arthur Hussey's Testamenta Cantiana, London 1906.

In the Greek Orthodox Church "Lampadarios" is a title (officium) of the Lower Clergy, given to the second in the rank Cantor, head of the left choir of Cantors. In the Ecumenical Patriarchate of Constantinople the Lampadarios is also responsible for teaching chanting to other clergy. The Lampadarios is usually candidate for promotion to First Cantor (Protopsaltes''). He is also entitled to act as a witness at various important acts of the Church.

References

Slavery in ancient Rome
Christianity in the Middle Ages
Byzantine music
Eastern Christian ecclesiastical offices
Byzantine ecclesiastical titles and offices